The Metal for Muthas Tour was a 1980 concert tour headlined variously by Motörhead, Samson, and Saxon. Supporting the new wave of British heavy metal compilation album Metal for Muthas, the tour featured a large number of bands identified as the founders of the movement. During the tour, the three headlining bands were supported by twenty-two other bands, including a then-unknown Iron Maiden, who performed on the first 11 dates of the tour.

Featured acts
 Air Angels 
Angel Witch 
Bad Manners 
Blitzfish 
Bombshell
Desolation Angels 
Diamond Head
Dogwatch 
Fist 
Iron Maiden
Magnum
The Monos 
More 
Motörhead
Nutz
Praying Mantis
Quartz 
Raven 
Samson
Saxon
Sledgehammer 
Toad the Wet Sprocket 
Urchin 
Witchfynde
Wounded John Scott Cree

Tour dates

References

Citations

Sources
 
 

Iron Maiden concert tours
1980 concert tours
1980 in British music
Concert tours of the United Kingdom